Hondo & Fabian is a children's picture book by Peter McCarty.  Released by Henry Holt & Co. in 2002, it is a Caldecott Honor book.  A sequel, Fabian Escapes, was released in 2007. The book was made into a 5-minute animated short with narration by Jeff Brooks and released by Weston Woods.

Plot
Hondo and Fabian illustrates the lives of two different friendly animals, a dog and a cat. Hondo the dog wakes up Fabian the cat hoping to have more adventures. Hondo decides to go fishing where he meets his friend Fred, another dog, while Fabian stays at home to play with a little girl. The day for each one of them is very different but exciting and at the end of the day they have their meal together and go to sleep in their favorite places.

References

American picture books
Children's fiction books
2002 children's books
Henry Holt and Company books
Caldecott Honor-winning works
Books about cats
Dogs in literature